The Acadian was the name of a passenger train of the Southern Pacific which ran daily as a night train between New Orleans, Louisiana, and Houston, Texas. The Acadian was one of several passenger trains, including the Sunset Limited and Argonaut, which operated over the eastern end (east of Houston) of the "Sunset Route". The 1956 iteration of the Acadian (which ran as #4 eastbound and #3 westbound) departed Houston at 9:45 pm and arrived in New Orleans at 7:20 am the following morning, while the westbound train departed New Orleans at 9:20 pm and arrived in Houston 7:10 am. The Southern Pacific ended the Acadian in 1956.

References 

Passenger trains of the Southern Pacific Transportation Company
Named passenger trains of the United States
1956 disestablishments in the United States
Passenger rail transportation in Louisiana
Passenger rail transportation in Texas
Railway services discontinued in 1956